Mark Wright (born 4 September 1981) is a former professional footballer who played in The Football League for Preston North End.

References

English footballers
Preston North End F.C. players
English Football League players
1981 births
Living people
Association football forwards